William Winfield "Windy" Nicklaus (January 6, 1904 – January 8, 1991) was an American football player and coach. He served as the head football coach at Oklahoma Baptist University from 1939 to 1940 and at West Texas A&M University in 1946. 

Nickaus attended Amarillo High School in Amarillo, Texas, where he was captain of the football team in 1922.
Nicklaus began his college football career at Bucknell University in 1924, playing for head coach Charley Moran, and transferred to Texas Tech University, where he was captain of the 1925 Texas Tech Matadors, the school's first football team.
Nickaus graduated from Texas Tech in 1928 and later coached football at Amarillo Junior High School. In 1935, he was appointed head football coach at Amarillo Junior College—now known  as Amarillo College—succeeding Frank Kimbrough. A year later, Nickaus moved on to Altus Junior College—now known as Western Oklahoma State College—in 
Altus, Oklahoma, serving as head football coach there for three seasons. He led his junior college football teams at the two schools to a record of 34–5 in four seasons.

Nicklaus was later an educator and civic leader in Amarillo. He died on January 8, 1991.

Head coaching record

College

Notes

References

External links
 

1904 births
1991 deaths
American football halfbacks
Bucknell Bison football players
Texas Tech Red Raiders football players
Texas Tech Red Raiders baseball players
Oklahoma Baptist Bison football coaches
West Texas A&M Buffaloes football coaches
Junior college football coaches in the United States
Sportspeople from Amarillo, Texas
Coaches of American football from Texas
Players of American football from Texas